For the plantation in Fredericksburg, Virginia, see Smithfield Plantation (Fredericksburg, Virginia).

The Smithfield Plantation is a former sugar plantation with a historic mansion in Port Allen, Louisiana, U.S. It has been listed on the National Register of Historic Places since April 7, 1995.

References

Houses on the National Register of Historic Places in Louisiana
Italianate architecture in Louisiana
Queen Anne architecture in Louisiana
Houses completed in 1875
Buildings and structures in West Baton Rouge Parish, Louisiana
Sugar plantations in Louisiana